The Duchy of Brabant was a State of the Holy Roman Empire established in 1183. It developed from the Landgraviate of Brabant and formed the heart of the historic Low Countries, part of the Burgundian Netherlands from 1430 and of the Habsburg Netherlands from 1482, until it was partitioned after the Dutch revolt.

Present-day North Brabant (Noord-Brabant) was ceded to the Generality Lands of the Dutch Republic according to the 1648 Peace of Westphalia, while the reduced duchy remained part of the Habsburg Netherlands until it was conquered by French Revolutionary forces in 1794, which was recognized by treaty in 1797. Today all the duchy's former territories, apart from exclaves, are in Belgium except for the Dutch province of North Brabant.

Geography

The Duchy of Brabant (adjective: Brabantian or Brabantine) was historically divided into four parts, each with its own capital. The four capitals were Leuven, Brussels, Antwerp and 's-Hertogenbosch. Before 's-Hertogenbosch was founded, Tienen was the fourth capital.

Its territory consisted essentially of the three modern-day Belgian provinces of Flemish Brabant, Walloon Brabant and Antwerp; the Brussels-Capital Region; and most of the present-day Dutch province of North Brabant. Its four chief cities were Brussels, Antwerp, Leuven and 's-Hertogenbosch.

Brabantian lion

The modern flag of Belgium takes its colors from Brabant's coat of arms: Sable a lion or armed and langued gules (a gold lion on a black field with red claws and tongue).

Probably first used by Count Lambert I of Louvain (ruled 1003–1015), the lion is documented in a 1306 town's seal of Kerpen, together with the red lion of Limburg. Up to the present, the Brabantian lion features as the primary heraldic charge on the coats of arms of both Flemish and Walloon Brabant, and of the Dutch province of North Brabant.

History

The region's name is first recorded as the Carolingian shire pagus Bracbatensis, located between the rivers Scheldt and Dijle, from braec "marshy" and bant "region". Upon the 843 Treaty of Verdun it was part of Lotharingia within short-lived Middle Francia, and was ceded to East Francia according to the 880 Treaty of Ribemont.

In earlier Roman times, the Nervii, a Belgic tribe, lived in the same area. They were incorporated into the Roman province of Belgica, and considered to have both Celtic and Germanic cultural links. At the end of the Roman period the region was conquered by the Germanic Franks.

Counts of Leuven
In 959 the East Frankish king Otto I of Germany elevated Count Godfrey of Jülich to the rank of duke of Lower Lorraine. In 962 the duchy became an integral part of the Holy Roman Empire, where Godfrey's successors of the ducal Ardennes-Verdun dynasty also ruled over the Gau of Brabant. Here, the counts of Leuven rose to power, when about 1000 Count Lambert I the Bearded married Gerberga, the daughter of Duke Charles of Lower Lorraine, and acquired the County of Brussels. About 1024 southernmost Brabant fell to Count Reginar V of Mons (Bergen, later Hainaut), and Imperial lands up to the Schelde river in the west came under the rule of the French Counts Baldwin V of Flanders by 1059. Upon the death of Count Palatine Herman II of Lotharingia in 1085, Emperor Henry IV assigned his fief between the Dender and Zenne rivers as the Landgraviate of Brabant to Count Henry III of Leuven and Brussels.

About one hundred years later, in 1183/1184, Emperor Frederick I Barbarossa formally established the Duchy of Brabant and created the hereditary title of duke of Brabant in favour of Henry I of Brabant, son of Count Godfrey III of Leuven. Although the original county was still quite small - and limited to the territory between the Dender and Zenne rivers, situated to the west of Brussels - from the 13th century onwards its name came to apply to the entire territory under control of the dukes.

In 1190, after the death of Godfrey III, Henry I also became Duke of Lower Lotharingia. By that time the title had lost most of its territorial authority. According to protocol, all his successors were thereafter called Dukes of Brabant and Lower Lotharingia (often called Duke of Lothier).

After the Battle of Worringen in 1288, the dukes of Brabant also acquired the Duchy of Limburg and the lands of Overmaas (trans-Meuse). In 1354 Duke John III of Brabant granted a Joyous Entry (charter of liberty) to the subjects of Brabant.

Burgundian and Habsburg Netherlands
In 1430 the Duchies of Lower Lotharingia, Brabant and Limburg were inherited by Philip the Good of Burgundy and became part of the Burgundian Netherlands.

In 1477 the Duchy of Brabant became part of the House of Habsburg as part of the dowry of Mary of Burgundy. At that time the Duchy extended from Luttre, south of Nivelles to 's Hertogenbosch, with Leuven as the capital city. The subsequent history of Brabant is part of the history of the Habsburg Seventeen Provinces.

Eighty Years War and division of Brabant

The Eighty Years' War (1568–1648) brought the northern parts (essentially the present Dutch province of North Brabant) under military control of the northern insurgents. After the Treaty of Westphalia in 1648, the United Provinces' independence was confirmed and northern Brabant was formally ceded to the United Provinces as Staats-Brabant, a federally governed territory and part of the Dutch Republic.

The southern part remained in Spanish Habsburg hands as a part of the Southern Netherlands. It was transferred to the Austrian branch of the Habsburg monarchy in 1714. Brabant was included in the unrecognised United States of Belgium, which existed from January to December 1790 during short-lived revolt against Emperor Joseph II, until imperial troops regained the Austrian Netherlands for Leopold II who had succeeded his brother.

The area was overrun during the French Revolution in 1794, and formally annexed by France in 1795. The duchy of Brabant was dissolved and the territory was reorganised in the départements of Deux-Nèthes (present province of Antwerp) and Dyle (the later province of Brabant).

After the defeat of Bonaparte in 1815, the United Kingdom of the Netherlands was created at the Congress of Vienna. The three old provinces were restored as North Brabant, Antwerp and South Brabant. The latter two became part of modern Belgium when it was created in 1830, South Brabant becoming simply Brabant province.

Cities of Brabant
Brabant had fortified walled cities and unwalled cities. The unwalled cities did not have the right to construct walls. Trade was allowed in the walled areas and usually this right resulted in a larger population and the development of major villages and later cities. The unwalled cities also had the right to hold markets, which they held on large market squares. This distinguishes them from surrounding villages that were not allowed to hold markets and did not possess market squares. Being unwalled also meant that some of these places suffered heavily in war and during the Dutch Revolt.

Quarter of Leuven

Walled cities
 Leuven: the capital city of the original region from where Brabant expanded. It has been a university town since 1425.
 Tienen: east of Leuven. Historically, it was, along with Lier and Diest, one of the bigger cities after the four regional city capitals.
 Zoutleeuw: east of Tienen. It lies near the border of Brabant. In its days, it was a wealthy merchant town. It was also the biggest garrison site near the border with Liege. A swamp separates Zoutleeuw from Liège.
 Landen: south east of Zoutleeuw; a small garrison town. But many noted people lived to the near south-west of it: Pepin of Landen, his wife, Itta of Metz (or St. Ida), and their daughter, St. Gertrude of Nivelles, as well as St. Bavo and St. Begga.
 Hannut: south of Landen. like Landen, it was a small garrison town.
 Aarschot: north east of Leuven. It was once the capital of the Duchy of Aarschot. It is famous for its fine architecture in the "Demer" gothic style, which uses a local type of red stone for its churches and other important buildings.
 Scherpenheuvel: east of Aarschot. It was, and is, the only baroque town in the Low Countries. As such, it is still an important place of pilgrimage.
 Zichem: north of Scherpenheuvel. The city was destroyed during the Dutch Revolt, which left it with a 'rural undeveloped character' ever since. The church and the Maagdentoren (tower of the Virgin) in local red stone are impressive buildings from Zichem's past. Zichem was once part of the Barony of Diest.
 Diest: east of Scherpenheuvel. It was one of Brabant's biggest cities, after the four capitals, and was an important brewery town. The city still counts numerous monuments of its past as attractions today. Like Zichem and Breda it is a Nassau city. Diest was also the capital of the Barony of Diest, and its lands.
 Halen: A small garrison city where the "Battle of the Silver Helmets" took place during World War I: a victory for the Royal Belgian Cavalry.
 Jodoigne: south of Tienen. The city and the surrounding area is known for its white stone, which gives the whole countryside a picturesque character. Many battles have taken place in this region, and other parts of Walloon Brabant.
 Gembloux: south west of Jodoigne. Is known for the fine buildings of Gembloux Abbey.

Unwalled cities
: south of Zoutleeuw. Although it holds city rights it never really developed into a city and could be considered a village.

Quarter of Brussels

Walled cities
Brussels: the capital city of this part of Brabant. Also former capital of the Seventeen Provinces, and of the Southern part of the Seventeen Provinces; today it is the capital of the Kingdom of Belgium. Once known as the 'city of nobles' because of the presence of the Royal Court.
 Vilvoorde: north of Brussels. The first modern purpose-built prison of the Austrian Netherlands was opened here in 1779.
 Nivelles: south of Brussels. Known for its beautiful church and as the birthplace of Saint Gertrude of Nivelles, who played an important role in the early history of Brussels and the local region.

Unwalled cities
 Braine-l'Alleud: south of Brussels. The famous Battle of Waterloo, where the Duke of Wellington of Great Britain defeated Emperor Napoleon I of France, took place near this small city. The church functioned as a hospital at the time for the many casualties of the conflict.
 Genappe: east of Nivelles; a small city with a charming old town centre developed around a market square.
 La Hulpe: north east of Braine-l'Alleud. Could be considered a village, although it was allowed to hold markets and held justice in its own small domain. It has become more well-known lately as the residence of Ernest Solvay.
 Overijse: south west of Brussels. Historically more important, as it held its own trade market Béguinage and cloth hall; but the city never expanded beyond the large market square.
 Tervuren: east of Brussels. Tervuren was the country residence of the Dukes of Brabant, and continued as such when the Habsburgs took over. Stately homes of the old noble families characterise Tervuren. Also, the more recent Congo Museum is situated in the Park of Tervuren.
 Duisburg: south east of Tervuren; was ruled by the Abbey of Coudenberg. who never allowed it to develop into a city.
 Merchtem: north west of Brussels. A rather small unwalled city, with pretensions, but it was larger than the towns of La Hulpe or Duisburg.
 Asse: West of Brussels. Next to Genappe and Braine Alleud, it was one of the bigger unwalled cities of the Brussels quarter. Today it has an old hospital and market square.
 Wavre: west of Jodoigne and today the capital of Walloon Brabant

Quarter of Antwerp

Walled cities
 Antwerp: the capital of this quarter. Also the episcopal see for this part of Brabant, which included the Barony of Breda and the Margraviate of Bergen op Zoom. Antwerp today is a city of business and trade with many fine merchant palaces still standing in the old town.
 Lier: south east of Antwerp. Known as the wedding site of the parents of Charles V, Holy Roman Emperor, an event which led to many future political changes.
 Herentals: east of Lier. A city located in a forested area.
 Zandvliet: north of Antwerp. A garrison city built to defend the Southern Netherlands.
 Bergen op Zoom: north of Zandvliet. Old fortified port town.
 Steenbergen: north of Bergen op Zoom; also an important port town.
 Breda: north east of Antwerp. One of the Nassau trade cities, fortified city and an important military center (even currently).

Unwalled cities
 Turnhout: de jure Turnhout was a walled city, but de facto the city stays unwalled. The largest of the unwalled cities of Brabant.
 Geel: east of Herentals. Known for its early and present health care facilities.
 Hoogstraten: north east of Antwerp. Capital of the County of Hoogstraten, later a Duchy of the Princes of Salm.
 Duffel: south of Antwerp. More illustrious in the past than it is today. An important barony of the later Middle Ages which was largely destroyed by wars. Its name has been remembered, and is now used as the common military name for a small clothes carrying bag.
 Walem: part of the Barony of Duffel; never became more than a village.
 Arendonk: east of Turnhout. Famous for training falcons and eagles for use in the Hunt.

Note: the city of Mechelen formed an independent state along with the Land of Heist-op-den-Berg and Gestel. Willemstad, Geertruidenberg and Klundert were part of the County of Holland.

Quarter of 's-Hertogenbosch
Source:

Walled cities
 Bois-le-Duc ('s-Hertogenbosch): regional capital city and episcopal see of this part of Brabant.
 Heusden: north west of 's Hertogenbosch. It was said to be an "untakeable city" (in the military sense), and it lies close to the boundaries of the old Counties of Holland and Guelders.
 Helmond: built as a military counterweight barrier to the counts of Guelders. It has a massive water fortress of historical interest.
 Ravenstein: east of 's Hertogenbosch. Founded by a vassal of the duke of Brabant. Became part of the Duchy of Cleves in 1397 and remained a separate territory until 1795. A later duke of Cleves sent his sister, Anne of Cleves, to England to become one of the two surviving wives of King Henry VIII.
 Meghem (now called Megen): north-west of Ravenstein. A small town, originally independent as capital of the county with the same name which later became semi-dependent of Brabant. Was granted city rights in 1357.
 Grave: south-east of Ravenstein: a smaller garrison town on the north-east side of Brabant and capital of the 'Land van Cuijk'. Was granted city rights in 1233. The lords of Grave aligned themselves with the dukes of Guelders, rivals of the dukes of Brabant, from time to time. Became an integral part of 'Staats-Brabant' in 1648.
 Eindhoven: was granted city rights in 1232 shortly after starting out as one of the first 'planned' new cities in Europe. Its magnificent walls were demolished in the Eighty Years War, and were never to be rebuilt.

Unwalled cities
 Oirschot
 Oisterwijk
 Waalwijk
 Vught

See also
 Duke of Brabant (with genealogies)
 War of Devolution (1667–1668)

References

Further reading 

 

 
Brabant, Duchy of
Brabant
History of Belgium
States and territories established in the 1180s
History of Brussels
History of Antwerp
1180s establishments in the Holy Roman Empire
1183 establishments in Europe
1794 disestablishments in the Habsburg monarchy
1794 disestablishments in the Holy Roman Empire
Disestablishments in the Austrian Netherlands
States and territories disestablished in 1794